"Under the Boardwalk" is a song recorded by the Drifters in 1964.

Under the Boardwalk may also refer to:
 Under the Boardwalk (1989 film), an American teen romance/drama film
 Under the Boardwalk (upcoming film), an upcoming computer-animated musical comedy film
 Under the Boardwalk: The Monopoly Story, a 2010 documentary